Båtsfjord is a municipality in Troms og Finnmark county, Norway. The administrative centre of the municipality is the village of Båtsfjord (which is the only settlement remaining in the municipality). Båtsfjord Airport is a new, modern airport, located just outside Båtsfjord village. The Hurtigruten coastal express ferry also has regularly-scheduled stops in Båtsfjord village.

The  municipality is the 60th largest by area out of the 356 municipalities in Norway. Båtsfjord is the 269th most populous municipality in Norway with a population of 2,165.

Historically, there were many other villages in the municipality, but they have been abandoned over the years. Some of these villages include Hamningberg (abandoned in 1964), Makkaur (abandoned in the 1950s), Sandfjord/Ytre Syltefjord (abandoned in 1946), Hamna (abandoned around 1950), and Nordfjord (abandoned in 1989).

General information

Vardø Municipality was established on 1 January 1838 (see formannskapsdistrikt law), encompassing the northeastern part of the Varanger Peninsula. In 1839, to comply with the formannskapsdistrikt law, the rural parts of the municipality, outside of the island/town of Vardø, were separated to form the new municipality of Vardø landdistrikt. Initially, Vardø landdistrikt had a population of 245. The new municipality was too small to be an official self-governing municipality, and it was not until 22 May 1868 when a royal resolution was passed that officially declared it a self-governing municipality. On 1 January 1874, a small part of Vardø landdistrikt (population: 48) was transferred to the town of Vardø. On 1 January 1955, the name was changed to Båtsfjord. During the 1960s, there were many municipal mergers across Norway due to the work of the Schei Committee. On 1 January 1964, the eastern fourth of Båtsfjord (population: 621) was transferred to the neighboring Vardø Municipality.

On 1 January 2020, the municipality became part of the newly formed Troms og Finnmark county. Previously, it had been part of the old Finnmark county.

Name
The name was originally Vardø landdistrikt (or Vardø landsogn) which both mean "the rural district of Vardø", since it surrounded the town of Vardø. On 1 January 1955, the name was changed to Båtsfjord since the village of Båtsfjord is the main population centre of the municipality. The village is located at the innermost part of a fjord, so the name has a very straightforward meaning.

Coat of arms
The coat of arms was granted on 19 April 1985. The official blazon is "Azure, a fish hook argent". This means the arms have a blue field (background) and the charge is a Stone Age bone fish hook. The fishing hook has a tincture of argent which means it is commonly colored white, but if it is made out of metal, then silver is used. The blue color in the field and the fish hook was chosen for the great economic importance of fishing and fish processing in the municipality. The shape of the hook was derived from ancient Stone Age hooks found in the municipality. The arms were designed by Arvid Sveen after a proposal by Svein Harald Eliassen.

Economy
Fishing permits (for salmon fishing) are sold for use on specific rivers, including Sandfjord-elva, Syltefjord-elva and Komag-elva. A crab factory was started in 2015. About 20 to 30 million Norwegian kroner was the cost of investment. It initially employed 28 people.

Government
All municipalities in Norway, including Båtsfjord, are responsible for primary education (through 10th grade), outpatient health services, senior citizen services, unemployment and other social services, zoning, economic development, and municipal roads. The municipality is governed by a municipal council of elected representatives, which in turn elect a mayor.  The municipality falls under the Øst-Finnmark District Court and the Hålogaland Court of Appeal.

Municipal council
The municipal council  of Båtsfjord is made up of 15 representatives that are elected to four year terms. The party breakdown of the council is as follows:

Mayors
The mayors of Båtsfjord:

1869-1869: Hans Juel Borchgrevink
1869–1870: Erik Hansen Bjerke
1871–1873: Oscar Lindboe
1874–1878: Erik Hansen Bjerke 
1879–1880: Jakob Hundseth 
1881–1882: Martin Hundseth
1883–1886: Hans Christian Enoksen  
1887–1896: Radmand Sundfær (H)
1897–1898: Nils Hamborg (V)
1899–1901: Johan Isaksen (H)
1902–1904: Nils Hamborg (V)
1905–1907: Albert Moe 
1908–1910: Mathias Fuglevik (V)
1911–1913: Johannes Sundfær  
1914–1916: Iver Paulsen (Ap)
1917–1919: Johan A. Abrahamsen 	
1920–1925: Arne Hansen 	
1926–1928: Johan A. Abrahamsen 
1929–1931: Richard Lind (Ap)
1932–1934: Thorleif Schirmer (Ap)
1935–1945: Alfred Halvari (NKP)
1946–1947: Johan Mikalsen (Ap)
1948–1963: Leif Nervik (Ap)
1964–1975: Ole Martin Nakken (Ap)
1975-1975: Einar Sørnes (Ap)
1976–1983: Arne Gundersen (Ap)
1984–1987: Peder Karlsen (Ap)
1988–1991: Tore Gundersen (Ap)
1991-1991: Aslaug Eriksen (Ap)
1992-1999: Leif Arne Viken (Ap)
1999-2003: Just Hjalmar Johansen (H)
2003-2007: Geir Knutsen (Ap)
2007-2009: Frank Bakke-Jensen (H)
2009-2011: Gunn Marit Nilsen (H)
2011-2019: Geir Knutsen (Ap)
2019–2021: Ronald Wærnes (Sp)
2021-present: Lone Johnsen (Sp)

Geography
It is situated on the northeastern coast of the Varanger Peninsula, on the rocky coastline of the Barents Sea. There are no native trees due to the climate. The Varangerhalvøya National Park lies in the southern part of the municipality. Makkaur Lighthouse lies along the shoreline, near the mouth of the Båtsfjorden, northeast of the village of Båtsfjord.

Previously, there were several villages along this barren coast, but today everyone lives in the village of Båtsfjord, with a sheltered harbor at the end of the Båtsfjorden inlet. Among the now-abandoned fishing villages is Hamningberg on the outer coast, which has many well-preserved 19th century wooden houses. Now, it is only used for summer vacation stays. The world's northernmost gannet colony to be found on the stack at Syltefjordstauran, along the Syltefjorden, north of the now-abandoned village of Nordfjord. Two pairs were discovered in 1961, but the colony has now grown to well over 300 pairs.

Buildings and structures

Churches
The Church of Norway has one parish within the municipality of Båtsfjord. It is part of the Varanger prosti (deanery) in the Diocese of Nord-Hålogaland. The main church is Båtsfjord Church. There are two other small chapels, but they are only used for special occasions since they are located in uninhabited areas that are only used for summer cottages.

Mast for broadcasting
  high guyed mast for FM-/TV-broadcasting. See List of tallest structures in Norway.

Notable people
 Geir Knutsen (born 1959) a Norwegian politician
 Frank Bakke-Jensen (born 1965), politician, Mayor of Båtsfjord from 2007, and Minister of Defence since 2017
 Gjert Ingebrigtsen (born 1966) a Norwegian sports coach
 Jan Thore Grefstad, (Norwegian Wiki) (born 1978), rock singer and songwriter

References

External links

Pictures of Wild life and nature in Båtsfjord

 
Municipalities of Troms og Finnmark
1839 establishments in Norway
Populated places of Arctic Norway
Barents Sea